Michael Liam Coady (born 1 October 1958 in Dipton, County Durham) is an English former professional footballer, who played for Sunderland AFC, Carlisle United, Sydney Olympic, Wolverhampton Wanderers and Barrow FC.

References

External links

1958 births
Living people
English footballers
Sunderland A.F.C. players
Carlisle United F.C. players
Wolverhampton Wanderers F.C. players
English Football League players
Association football defenders
People from Dipton, County Durham
Footballers from County Durham
Barrow A.F.C. players
English expatriate footballers
Expatriate soccer players in Australia
Sydney Olympic FC players